Faisal II ( el-Malik Faysal ath-thânî) (2 May 1935 – 14 July 1958) was the last King of Iraq. He reigned from 4 April 1939 until July 1958, when he was killed during the 14 July Revolution. This regicide marked the end of the thirty-seven-year-old Hashemite monarchy in Iraq, which then became a republic.

The only son of King Ghazi of Iraq and Queen Aliya, Faisal acceded to the throne at the age of three after his father was killed in a car crash. A regency was set up under his uncle Prince 'Abd al-Ilah. In 1941, a pro-Axis coup d'état overthrew the regent. The British responded by initiating an invasion of Iraq a month later and restored 'Abd al-Ilah to power. During the Second World War, Faisal was evacuated along with his mother to the United Kingdom. There, he attended Harrow School alongside his cousin Hussein, the future King of Jordan. The regency ended in May 1953 when Faisal came of age.

The overthrow of the Egyptian monarchy in 1953 and the formation of the United Arab Republic in February 1958 only provided impetuses to ideas of a revolution. The Hashemite Arab Federation was formed between Iraq and Jordan in February 1958 with Faisal as its head, which did not quell widespread opposition. In July 1958, a group of Royal Iraqi Army officers led by Abd al-Karim Qasim mounted a coup d'état and overthrew the monarchy. Faisal was executed along with numerous members of his family in the process.

Family and early life

Birth and early years

Faisal was the only son of King Ghazi of Iraq and his wife, Queen Aliya, second daughter of 'Ali bin Hussein, King of the Hejaz and Grand Sharif of Mecca.  Faisal's father was killed in a mysterious car crash when he was three years old; his uncle, Prince 'Abd al-Ilah, served as regent until Faisal came of age in 1953. He also suffered from asthma.

1941 coup

Faisal's childhood coincided with the Second World War, in which the Hashemite Kingdom of Iraq was formally allied with the British Empire and the Allies. In April 1941, his uncle 'Abd al-Ilah was briefly deposed as Regent by a military coup d'état which aimed to align Iraq with the Axis powers. The 1941 coup in Iraq soon led to the Anglo-Iraqi War. German aid proved insufficient, and the Regent 'Abd al-Ilah was restored to power by a combined Allied force composed of the mercenary Jordanian Arab Legion, the Royal Air Force and other British units. Iraq resumed its British ties, and at the end of the war joined the United Nations.

During his early years, Faisal was tutored at the royal palace with several other Iraqi boys. During the Second World War, he lived for a time with his mother at Grove Lodge at Winkfield Row in Berkshire in England. As a teenager, Faisal attended Harrow School with his second cousin Prince Hussein, later to become King Hussein of Jordan. The two boys were close friends, and reportedly planned early on to merge their two realms, to counter what they considered to be the "threat" of Communism and left-leaning variants of pan-Arab nationalism. Recently, 143 drawings drawn by Faisal using either pencil or crayon were put on display at Iraq’s National Archives depicting backdrops of the war he lived through. Such as drawings of aircraft, bombs, killer robots, and extreme fighting on both land and sea but some drawings depict more peaceful subjects, including landscapes, birds, and buildings, as well as maps of Europe and North Africa. These drawings offered a look into his mind during the chaotic time.

1952 United States tour 
In 1952, at age 17, Faisal began plans to visit the United States and its many development projects such as agriculture, power projects, canal systems, and land reclamation schemes. It was of particular interest to the King especially the Irrigation projects as Faisal would later tell the New York press that it was “very much needed in our country."

The next day, Faisal went on a tour of the Empire State Building and after arriving at the City Hall for a reception with Mayor Vincent R. Impellitteri, he famously went to attend a game held in the Ebbets Field. The visit was covered by many news outlets nationwide that many forgot Faisal's original motives for the visit. He would also famously be on the side of Brooklyn Dodgers but reportedly couldn't tell the difference between them and the other team, the New York Giants, in which one of his aides told him that it the team's names are written on their clothes.

In the following days, he would tour the Radio City Music Hall and the Esso Oil Company. On the 16th of August, both would depart from LaGuardia Airport for Washington, D.C. where he met President Harry Truman. Over the following weeks, he would meet other famous Americans such as Dean Acheson, the actor James Mason, and Jackie Robinson, among others.

Reign 
Less than a year after his visit to the United States, Faisal attained his majority on 2 May 1953, commencing his active rule with little experience and during a changing Iraqi political and social climate exacerbated by the rapid development of pan-Arab nationalism. Reportedly, his reign was marked by tolerance and co-existence with other faiths and branches of Islam and projects such as an irrigation project, inspired by the US project. Faisal initially relied for political advice upon his uncle Prince 'Abd al-Ilah and General Nuri al-Sa'id, a veteran politician and nationalist who had already served several terms as Prime Minister. However, Faisal's reign simultaneously grew increasingly unstable against a backdrop of economic inequality coupled with the rise of Communism, anti-imperialist sentiment, and mounting Pan-Arab nationalism.

Hastening Faisal's demise was the decision taken by his regent (later confirmed by him) to allow the United Kingdom to retain a continued role in Iraqi affairs, through the Anglo-Iraqi Treaty of 1948, and later the Baghdad Pact, signed in 1955. Increasing massive protests greeted news of each of these alliances, contributing to the deaths of hundreds of demonstrators and an increasing deterioration of loyalty to the Iraqi Crown.

As oil revenues increased during the 1950s, the king and his advisers chose to invest their wealth in development projects, which some claimed increasingly alienated the rapidly growing middle class and the peasantry. The Iraqi Communist Party increased its influence. Though the regime seemed secure, an intense dissatisfaction with Iraq's condition brewed just below the surface. An ever-widening gap between the wealth of the political elites, landowners, and other supporters of the regime on the one hand, and the poverty of workers and peasants on the other, intensified opposition to Faisal's government. Since the upper classes controlled the parliament, reformists increasingly saw revolution as their sole hope for improvement. The Egyptian Revolution of 1952, led by Gamal Abdel Nasser, provided an impetus for a similar undertaking in Iraq.

Plans for Greater Baghdad 

During his reign, Faisal initiated large-scale plans for the modernization of Greater Baghdad. The goal of this ambitious project was to improve and develop infrastructure and housing, provide essential public buildings, reform the building industries and train future Iraqi architects to not rely on Western help. The increase in the economy that subsequently enabled the plans for Greater Baghdad to be developed was due to negotiations with the British-controlled Iraq Petroleum Company in 1952 that achieved an equitable share of oil rights and a substantial increase in Iraq’s revenue. Faisal also created the semiautonomous Development Board which consisted of six members including a foreign advisor with the goal of improving living conditions and construction. After various negotiations, the board received a percentage of the annual oil revenue and in 1955 it established a six-year plan with a larger budget, a quarter of which was assigned to public buildings. In an effort to secure the authority of King Faisal II and the Royal Family and to thwart possible tensions, funds needed to be invested in urban areas where it was feared the conflict would potentially appear.

Many architects from around the world were invited, among them were Alvar Aalto, Walter Gropius, (who designed the faculty tower and gateway monument to Baghdad University) Le Corbusier and many more. Commissions for public buildings followed and the first ones went to the German architect Werner March for the Iraq Museum and the English firm J. Brian Cooper to build the National Parliament and the Royal Palace. An architect competition was set up for the National Bank which Swiss architect William Dunkel won. Some of the buildings designed during the plan were built even decades later after Faisal's reign ended under Saddam Hussein such as the Baghdad Gymnasium which was designed by Le Corbusier. Frank Wright was also invited by Faisal to design much of Newer Baghdad, Wright seemed to not regard Iraq as an underdeveloped nation and wanted to preserve its character. Inspired by Harun al-Rashid and the Arabian Nights, Wright's plans seemed to echo old Abbasid architecture in Baghdad such as circular layout and are imbued in greenery to allude to the Garden of Eden.

Despite the contribution to the development of the city, some have criticized Faisal's plans for Greater Baghdad and the many styles that he introduced to be a "Westernization" of Iraq. The plans also acquired international attention as a letter from the British Board of Trade demonstrates that was sent to a number of British architects. Some of the criticism of the plans were used as justification during the 14 July Revolution.

The Arab Federation. 

On 1 February 1958, neighboring Syria joined with Nasser's Egypt to form the United Arab Republic which Iraq did not recognize. This prompted the Hashemite kingdoms of Iraq and Jordan to strengthen their ties by establishing a similar alliance. King Hussein bin Talal, King of Jordan, sent his court minister to Baghdad, carrying a message to Faisal inviting him to go with some ministers to Amman, to consider the consequences of the event. On February 11, 1958, the King of Iraq went with some ministers, the Chief of Staff of the Army, and the Chief of the Royal Court. On the next day, Abd al-Ilah joined them, and there the two parties reached, on February 14, 1958, the declaration of the Arab Hashemite Union between Iraq and Jordan, also known as the "Arab Federation." Originally, Kuwait was to join but Britain was opposed to the unification.

Faisal, as the senior member of the Hashemite family, became its head of state and the head of the Union Government, and in his absence, Hussein would head the Union Government. The Federation was also open to other Arab countries joining it.

Downfall and murder

An opposition forms
Faisal's political situation deteriorated in 1956, with uprisings in the cities of Najaf and Hayy. Meanwhile, Israel's attack on Egypt, coordinated with Britain and France in response to Nasser's nationalization of the Suez Canal, only exacerbated popular revulsion for the Baghdad Pact, and thus Faisal's regime. The opposition began to coordinate its activities; in February 1957, a "Front of National Union" was established, bringing together the National Democrats, Independents, Communists, and the Ba'ath Party. An identical process ensued within the Iraqi officer corps with the formation of a "Supreme Committee of Free Officers". Faisal's government endeavored to preserve the military's loyalty through generous benefits, but this proved increasingly ineffective as more and more officers came to sympathize with the nascent pro-republican anti-monarchist movement.

14 July Revolution

In the summer of 1958, King Hussein of Jordan asked for Iraqi military assistance during the escalating Lebanon crisis. Units of the Royal Iraqi Army under the command of Colonel Abd al-Karim Qasim, en route to Jordan, chose to march on Baghdad instead, where they mounted a coup d'état on 14 July. During the 14 July Revolution, Faisal II ordered the Royal Guard to offer no resistance and surrendered to the insurgents. Around 8 am, Captain Abdul Sattar Sabaa Al-Ibousi, leading the revolutionary assault group at the Rihab Palace, which was still the principal royal residence in central Baghdad, ordered the King, Crown Prince 'Abd al-Ilah, Crown Princess Hiyam ('Abd al-Ilah's wife), Princess Nafeesa ('Abd al-Ilah's mother), Princess Abadiya (Faisal's aunt) and several servants to gather in the palace courtyard (the young King had not yet moved into the newly completed Royal Palace). There they were told to turn toward the wall and were immediately executed by their captors.

Aftermath
Many years later, when the Iraqi historian Safa Khulusi met Al-Ibousi, who was once one of Khulusi's students, and questioned him on his part in Faisal's death, the former student answered, "all I did was remember Palestine, and the trigger on the machine-gun just set itself off".

During the regime of Saddam Hussein, Faisal II was reburied under a marble tomb located next to that of his father in the restored Royal Mausoleum in Baghdad.

Notable published works
Faisal II was the author of Ways to Defend Yourself (1951), an Arabic book on judo and self-defense, and he printed 50 copies of it and gave it to other kings and leaders on top of them his uncle King Abdullah of Jordan. He also gave a copy of it to the League of Arab Nations hoping to reprint it and distribute it for free to the youth in Arab countries, but that never happened.

In pop culture 

 It has been suggested before that Belgian comic creator, Hergé, used young Faisal as the inspiration for the Character of Prince Abdullah of Khemed in the fifteenth volume of The Adventures of Tintin: Land of Black Gold. It's even suggested that the portrait of Prince Abdullah in the same storyline was inspired by the young King's portrait.
 Footage of Faisal along with Abd al-Ilah was shown in The Rock 'n' Roll Years episode "1958" in which the events of the 14 July coup were also talked about.

Military ranks
Faisal held the following ranks:
Admiral of the Fleet, Royal Iraqi Navy.
Field Marshal, Royal Iraqi Army.
Marshal of the Royal Iraqi Air Force.
Air Vice-Marshal (honorary), Royal Air Force.

Ancestry

Namesakes
Martyr Faisal II College (Kolleyet Al-Shahid Faisal Al-Thani) is a military school in Jordan that was named after him.

See also 
The late Sharif Ali bin al-Hussein – The cousin of King Faisal II who lived in Iraq and had a political platform to establish a constitutional monarchy in Iraq.
Prince Ra'ad, head of the royal house of Iraq.
Nuri al-Said – The Prime Minister of the Hashemite Kingdom of Iraq who was also executed by supporters of Colonel Abdul Karim Qassim.
Arab Federation, the short-lived union between Jordan and Iraq where Faisal became its head of state. 
History of Iraq.

Notes

External links

Further reading
Khadduri, Majid. Independent Iraq, 1932–1958. 2nd ed. Oxford University Press, 1960.
Lawrence, T. E. Seven Pillars of Wisdom.  Retrieved 14 July 2008
Longrigg, Stephen H. Iraq, 1900 to 1950. Oxford University Press, 1953.
Morris, James. The Hashemite Kings.  London, 1959.
De Gaury, Gerald. Three kings in Baghdad, 1921-1958 (Hutchinson, 1961).

|-

20th century in Iraq
20th-century murdered monarchs
Assassinated heads of state
Faisal II of Iraq
Faisal II of Iraq
Chief Commanders of the Legion of Merit
Executed Iraqi people
Executed monarchs
Field marshals of Iraq
Grand Cordons of the Order of Independence (Jordan)
Honorary Knights Grand Cross of the Royal Victorian Order
House of Hashim
Kings of Iraq
Faisal, II
Marshals of the Royal Iraqi Air Force
Faisal, II
People educated at Sandroyd School
People executed by Iraq by firing squad
People from Baghdad
People from Winkfield
Royal Air Force air marshals
20th-century Arabs